The Oakland Independent is a weekly newspaper covering the town of Oakland, Nebraska and surrounding Burt County. The paper was founded in 1880 and claims 1,725 readers. From 1907 to 1984, the paper was called Oakland Independent and Republican. As of 2020 the chief editor is Curt Hineline and the newspaper is published by Enterprise Media Group of Blair.

References

Newspapers published in Nebraska
Newspapers established in 1880
1880 establishments in Nebraska